Rod Cameron (born Nathan Roderick Cox; December 7, 1910 – December 21, 1983) was a Canadian film and television  actor whose career extended from the 1930s to the 1970s. He appeared in horror, war, action and science fiction movies, but is best remembered for his many westerns.

Early years
Cameron was born in Calgary, Alberta, Canada, and grew up in New Jersey. He played on his high school basketball team and on a semi-professional football team. Despite those activities and others such as swimming and playing ice hockey, he couldn't join the Royal Canadian Mounted Police in Canada as a young man because he failed the physical examination.

Films 
Cameron moved to Hollywood as a young man and started out as a stuntman and bit player for Paramount Pictures as well as a stand-in for Fred MacMurray. His early films include Heritage of the Desert with Donald Woods and Russell Hayden, Rangers of Fortune with Fred MacMurray, North West Mounted Police and Henry Aldrich for President with Jimmy Lydon. He also played bit roles at Universal Pictures, including in If I Had My Way, starring Bing Crosby and Gloria Jean. He appeared in a horror film The Monster and the Girl and played Jesse James in The Remarkable Andrew for Paramount.

In 1943, Cameron gained star status in action serials for Republic Pictures. As crime-busting federal agent Rex Bennett, Cameron battled enemy terrorists in 15 weekly episodes of G-Men vs. the Black Dragon. He was already working in another serial when audience reaction to Black Dragon made him a hit. He appeared in another Rex Bennett adventure, Secret Service in Darkest Africa, with Cameron again battling against Axis agents.

When cowboy star Johnny Mack Brown left Universal Pictures for Monogram Pictures, Cameron replaced him as Universal's western series star. Universal soon gave him straight character roles in feature films, including Salome, Where She Danced and River Lady both co-starring fellow Canadian Yvonne De Carlo.

During World War II Cameron played in Commandos Strike at Dawn and played a US Marine in  Wake Island (1942) and Gung Ho! (1943).

Universal reorganized as Universal-International and downsized its activities in 1947, leaving Cameron and other contract players unemployed. He was hired by Monogram Pictures for a long string of outdoor action pictures. In 1948, he starred in Panhandle (a movie with a script co-written by Blake Edwards) for Allied Artists.

In 1949, Cameron appeared with Bonita Granville in the comedy film Strike It Rich. He then appeared in many westerns and other films for Republic Pictures including Santa Fe Passage (1955), and later The Gun Hawk (1963), Requiem for a Gunfighter (1965) and The Bounty Killer (1965).

Cameron traveled to Europe in 1964 to play the lead in Spaghetti Westerns such as Bullets Don't Argue (1964) and Bullet in the Flesh (1965).  He later appeared in such films as The Last Movie (1971), Evel Knievel (1971) and Psychic Killer (1975).

Television
Cameron starred in three syndicated television series: City Detective (1953–1955), State Trooper (1956–1959), and the Coronado 9 (1960–1961). In City Detective, Cameron appeared as the tough New York City police Lieutenant Bart Grant. In State Trooper, a 1950s-style western-themed crime drama, Cameron starred as Lieutenant Rod Blake of the Nevada State Police. In Coronado 9, set in the San Diego area, Cameron appeared as Dan Adams, a private detective.

Hal Erickson, in his book, Syndicated Television: The First Forty Years, 1947–1987, cited Cameron's business sense in confining his work in TV series to syndication: "A canny businessman, Cameron knew that his City Detective residuals wouldn't have been as fat had a major television network been claiming a percentage of the action, and as a result the actor vowed to remain in syndication for the rest of his TV career. By 1960, Cameron was drawing over $200,000 per annum in residuals [from his three syndicated programs]..."

Cameron himself guest starred in many westerns, including six appearances on NBC's Laramie, with John Smith and Robert Fuller. In "Drifter's Gold" (November 29, 1960), Cameron plays Tom Bedloe, an outlaw who has started the rumor of a nearby gold strike. When series lead Slim Sherman, played by John Smith, comes to Laramie to buy supplies, he finds the town nearly deserted and must pretend to be an outlaw to survive. Meanwhile, Bedloe is looking for Marcie Benson, the daughter he has never seen, played by Judi Meredith. Gregory Walcott plays Duke, Bedloe's partner in crime.

In another Laramie episode, "Broken Honor" (April 9, 1963), Cameron and Peggy McCay portray Roy and Martha Halloran, a farm couple who stumbles upon $30,000 in money found inside a strong box on their property. The loot had been seized in a stagecoach heist and hidden away for later retrieval.  Roy, who is reliant on a wheelchair, insists on keeping the money until Jess Harper arrives amid grave danger to all of their lives from the bandits searching about for the missing money. One of the bandits is played by Don "Red" Barry, best remembered from the 1940 film Adventures of Red Ryder. Cameron also guest starred in the NBC's western Bonanza in 1966: he portrayed Curtis Wade in the two-part episode "Ride The Wind". Cameron also guest starred in season 6 episode 18 of western TV series "The Tales of Wells Fargo".

Cameron guest starred in such dramatic series as Crossroads, in which he portrayed Dr. Ervin Seale in the 1956 episode "Deadly Fear." He guest starred too on CBS's Perry Mason, with Raymond Burr, as defendant Grover Johnson in the 1963 episode, "The Case of the Bouncing Boomerang." He continued to work in motion pictures and television into the 1970s. He appeared in season 2 of James Garner's NBC detective series, The Rockford Files. Cameron also appeared in two episodes of ADAM-12 in 1975.

Personal life
In 1960, he divorced his wife and, soon after, married her mother. Director William Witney publicly acclaimed Cameron as the bravest man that he had ever seen.

In the 1970s, Cameron became involved with efforts to treat alcoholism. He was active in the Alcoholism Council of San Fernando Valley in Van Nuys, California, and he spoke to groups about problems related to alcoholism.

In his later years, he lived on Lake Lanier in northern Georgia. After an extended battle with cancer, Cameron died in a hospital in
nearby Gainesville, aged 73.

He was posthumously awarded a star on the Hollywood Walk of Fame.

Quote
I got on a horse and that was my big mistake. I didn't even know how to ride a horse when I came to Los Angeles. Even after I did 400 episodes on three different detective series, "Coronado Nine", "City Detective" and "State Trooper", casting directors would say "Oh yes, Rod Cameron, the cowboy".

Selected filmography

Heritage of the Desert (1939) - Cowhand (uncredited)
The Old Maid (1939) - Minor Role (scenes deleted)
If I Had My Way (1940) - Slim - Bridge Worker (uncredited)
Those Were the Days! (1940) - Bartlett - Student Waiter (uncredited)
Stagecoach War (1940) - Townsman (uncredited)
Rangers of Fortune (1940) - Shelby Henchman (uncredited)
The Quarterback (1940) - Tex
North West Mounted Police (1940) - Corporal Underhill
Christmas in July (1940) - Dick
Life with Henry (1940) - Bill Van Dusen
The Monster and the Girl (1941) - Sam Daniels
I Wanted Wings (1941) - Voice on loudspeaker (uncredited)
Riders of Death Valley (1941, Serial) - Rider (uncredited)
The Parson of Panamint (1941) - Porter, Young Prospector, 'Son' in Prologue (uncredited)
Buy Me That Town (1941) - Gerard
Nothing but the Truth (1941) - Sailor (uncredited)
Henry Aldrich for President (1941) - Ed Calkins
The Night of January 16th (1941) - Attorney Polk's Assistant
No Hands on the Clock (1941) - Tom Reed
Among the Living (1941) - Eddie - Man in Cafe (uncredited)
Pacific Blackout (1941) - Pilot
The Fleet's In (1942) - 'Texas' - Sailor (uncredited)
The Remarkable Andrew (1942) - Jesse James
True to the Army (1942) - Pvt. O'Toole
Priorities on Parade (1942) - Stage Manager
Wake Island (1942) - Capt. Pete Lewis
The Forest Rangers (1942) - Jim Lawrence
Star Spangled Rhythm (1942) - Petty Officer (uncredited)
Commandos Strike at Dawn (1942) - Pastor
G-Men vs. the Black Dragon (1943, Serial) - Agent Rex Bennett
No Time for Love (1943) - Taylor (uncredited)
Honeymoon Lodge (1943) - Big Boy Carson
Secret Service in Darkest Africa (1943, Serial) - Rex Bennett
The Good Fellows (1943) - Soldier (uncredited)
The Kansan (1943) - Kelso
Riding High (1943) - Sam Welch
Gung Ho! (1943) - Pvt Rube Tedrow 
Boss of Boomtown (1944) - Steve Hazard
Trigger Trail (1944) - Clint Farrel
Mrs. Parkington (1944) - Al Swann
Riders of the Santa Fe (1944) - Matt Conway
The Old Texas Trail (1944) - Jim Wiley, posing as Rawhide Carney
Salome, Where She Danced (1945) - Jim
Beyond the Pecos (1945) - Lew RemingtonSwing Out, Sister (1945) - Geoffrey CabotRenegades of the Rio Grande (1945) - Buck EmersonFrontier Gal (1945) - Jonathan HartThe Runaround (1946) - Eddie J. KildanePirates of Monterey (1947) - Captain Phillip KentPanhandle (1948) - John SandsRiver Lady (1948) - Dan CorriganThe Plunderers (1948) - John DrumBelle Starr's Daughter (1948) - Bob 'Bitter Creek' YauntisStrike It Rich (1948) - Duke MasseyStampede (1949) - Mike McCallBrimstone (1949) - Johnny TremaineDakota Lil (1950) - Harve Logan / Kid CurryStage to Tucson (1950) - Grif HolbrookShort Grass (1950) - Steve LlewellynOh! Susanna (1951) - Captain Webb CalhounCavalry Scout (1951) - Kirby FryeThe Sea Hornet (1951) - Gunner McNeilFort Osage (1952) - Tom Clay
 Wagons West (1952) - Jeff CurtisThe Jungle (1952) - Steve BentleyWoman of the North Country (1952) - Kyle RamloRide the Man Down (1952) - Will BallardSan Antone (1953) - Carl MillerThe Steel Lady (1953) - Mike MonahanSouthwest Passage (1954) - Edward Fitzpatrick BealeHell's Outpost (1954) - Tully GibbsSanta Fe Passage (1955) - Jess GriswoldDouble Jeopardy (1955) - Marc HillHeadline Hunters (1955) - Hugh 'Woody' WoodruffThe Fighting Chance (1955) - Bill BinyonPassport to Treason (1955) - Mike O'KellyYaqui Drums (1956) - Webb DunhamSpoilers of the Forest (1957) - Boyd CaldwellEscapement (1958) - Jeff KeenanThe Man Who Died Twice (1958) - William 'Bill' BrennonGunfight at Blackhorse Canyon (1961)Laramie (1961 episode "The Last Journey") - John Cole Perry Mason (TV series) (1963)(Case of the Bouncing Boomerang) - Grover Johnson
The Gun Hawk (1963) - Sheriff Ben Corey
Bullets Don't Argue (1964) - Pat Garrett
Bullet in the Flesh (1964) - Nathaniel Masters
Requiem for a Gunfighter (1965) - Dave McCloud
The Bounty Killer (1965) - Johnny Liam
Winnetou and Old Firehand (1966) - Old Firehand
Evel Knievel (1971) - Charlie Knesson
The Last Movie (1971) - Pat Garrett
The French Love (1972) - (uncredited)
Jessi's Girls (1975) - Rufe
Psychic Killer (1975) - Dr. Commanger
Love and the Midnight Auto Supply (1977) - Sheriff Dawson

References

External links

 
 Rod Cameron Western comic book from the Internet Archive

1910 births
1983 deaths
20th-century American male actors
Canadian male film actors
Canadian male television actors
Canadian expatriate male actors in the United States
Male actors from Calgary
Male film serial actors
Paramount Pictures contract players
20th-century Canadian male actors
Western (genre) television actors